Boston is a monthly magazine concerning life in the Greater Boston area and has been in publication since 1805.

History and profile
Boston magazine was started in 1805. Metrocorp, Inc. bought the magazine in 1970. The company also owns Philadelphia magazine. The magazine claims a publication of 500,000 issues per month, its percentage of newsstand copies sold is among the highest of any magazine of any kind in the United States, and it has been named among the best city magazines in the nation nine times in the last ten years by the City and Regional Magazine Association.

Former editors-in-chief include Carly Carioli, John Wolfson, and Andrew Putz.

In May 2015 Boston magazine was awarded by the City and Regional Magazine Association.

Best of Boston
"Best of Boston" is an award given by Boston magazine in an annual issue which is "the definitive guide to the city’s finest". It was first awarded in 1974.

This award is given in various categories that vary from year-to-year. Recent awards include best clam chowder, cookware, day spa, gym, jewelry store, martini, mojito, pizza topping, shiatsu, teeth whitening, thai food, and many more.

Many area businesses display these awards proudly in the form of a certificate or by using the award logo on company materials, store windows, and advertising.  Along with the annual awards, Boston magazine also runs feature articles intended to quantify local resources, such as "Top Schools", "Top Restaurants", and "Top Doctors".

Ancillary publications
Boston magazine produces several ancillary publications:
 Boston Home is a quarterly publication geared towards readers interested in high-end interior design, home decor, and architecture.
 Boston Weddings is a biannual publication for wedding planners and brides-to-be.

Business relationships
 Boston magazine has been owned by the Philadelphia-based company Metrocorp (sometimes rendered in camel case as "MetroCorp") since 1971.
 WCVB-TV Channel 5, WBZ NewsRadio, Greater Media, WBUR, and Magic 106.7 collaborate and cross-promote with Boston magazine.
 Boston magazine is a member of the American Society of Magazine Editors (ASME).

References

External links
 

1805 establishments in Massachusetts
Lifestyle magazines published in the United States
Local interest magazines published in the United States
Monthly magazines published in the United States
City guides
Magazines established in 1805
Magazines published in Boston